Phyllotrox is a genus of true weevils in the beetle family Curculionidae. There are at least 60 described species in Phyllotrox.

Species
These 60 species belong to the genus Phyllotrox:

 Phyllotrox abdominalis Schaufuss, 1866
 Phyllotrox aristidis Voisin, 1986
 Phyllotrox ater Champion, 1902
 Phyllotrox atratus Franz, 2006
 Phyllotrox attaleae Rheinheimer, 2012
 Phyllotrox callosipennis Hustache, 1930
 Phyllotrox canyonaceris Warner, 1976
 Phyllotrox crassipes Champion, 1902
 Phyllotrox deknuydti Rheinheimer, 2014
 Phyllotrox depressus Champion, 1902
 Phyllotrox derivatus (Fall, 1913)
 Phyllotrox dimidiatus Faust, 1893
 Phyllotrox elongatulus Voss, 1954
 Phyllotrox eupatorii Voss, 1954
 Phyllotrox ferrugineus LeConte, 1876
 Phyllotrox flavescens Champion, 1902
 Phyllotrox fulvipennis Sleeper, 1955
 Phyllotrox fulvus Champion, 1902
 Phyllotrox inconspicuus Champion, 1902
 Phyllotrox lamottei Voisin, 1989
 Phyllotrox liturellus Suffrian, 1871
 Phyllotrox maculicollis Champion, 1902
 Phyllotrox marcidus Champion, 1902
 Phyllotrox marginellus Faust, 1893
 Phyllotrox mecinoides Champion, 1902
 Phyllotrox megalops Champion, 1902
 Phyllotrox melastomataceae Voss, 1954
 Phyllotrox micros Rheinheimer, 2012
 Phyllotrox montanus Champion, 1902
 Phyllotrox mundus Faust, 1893
 Phyllotrox nigripennis Hustache, 1930
 Phyllotrox nigriventris Hustache, 1929
 Phyllotrox nigroventris Hustache, 1930
 Phyllotrox nitens Rheinheimer, 2014
 Phyllotrox nubifer LeConte, 1876
 Phyllotrox pallidus Fåhraeus, 1843
 Phyllotrox posticus Schaufuss, 1866
 Phyllotrox propoculis Rheinheimer, 2012
 Phyllotrox pseudomicros Rheinheimer, 2012
 Phyllotrox pusillus Kirsch, 1874
 Phyllotrox quadricollis Fall, 1907
 Phyllotrox rostralis Voss, 1954
 Phyllotrox rubiginosus Faust, 1893
 Phyllotrox rufipennis Schaufuss, 1866
 Phyllotrox rufipes Faust, 1893
 Phyllotrox rufus Schoenherr, 1843
 Phyllotrox rugirostris Schaufuss, 1866
 Phyllotrox rutilus (Fall, 1913)
 Phyllotrox schirmi Voss, 1954
 Phyllotrox sejunctus (Fall, 1913)
 Phyllotrox semirufus Boheman, 1843
 Phyllotrox seriatus Clark, 1990
 Phyllotrox sericeus Faust, 1893
 Phyllotrox snizeki Rheinheimer, 2012
 Phyllotrox speculator Kirsch, 1874
 Phyllotrox subopacus Schaufuss, 1866
 Phyllotrox sulcirostris Champion, 1902
 Phyllotrox tatianae Franz, 2006
 Phyllotrox variabilis Schaufuss, 1866
 Phyllotrox variegatus Suffrian, 1871

References

Further reading

 
 
 

Curculioninae
Articles created by Qbugbot